A Kitten for Hitler, also known as Ein Kitten für Hitler, is a 2007 short film directed by British director Ken Russell. Russell created it intending to be offensive. This caused casting problems, so he decided to cast an adult with dwarfism instead of a young child for the lead role. Russell thus cast Rusty Goffe, who played an Oompa-Loompa in the 1971 film Willy Wonka and the Chocolate Factory, to play the lead role of Lenny, an American Jewish boy who aims to inspire a change of heart in Hitler. The film premiered on the website Comedybox.tv on 1 July 2007.

Plot
In the winter of 1941, a Jewish woman and her young son, Lenny, are watching a newsreel at a Brooklyn movie theater. A reel featuring Adolf Hitler appears on screen, sparking loud disapproval from the audience. Lenny asks his mother why no one likes Hitler, and his mother explains Hitler's atrocities. Lenny wonders aloud what Santa Claus will give him for Christmas, but his mother replies Hitler won't get anything for Christmas.

This prompts Lenny to travel alone to Germany to give Hitler a kitten for Christmas, hoping it will soften Hitler's heart and make him reconsider his actions. Upon Lenny's arrival, he presents the boxed gift to Hitler, who fears it's a bomb, and tosses it to his mistress, Eva Braun. She opens it to discover a kitten, which she gives to Hitler, who is moved to tears. As Hitler embraces his gift, his mood changes when Lenny reveals he has a swastika-shaped birthmark on his stomach, and Hitler notices his star of David necklace. Horrified and infuriated, Hitler has Eva slaughter Lenny, and skin the boy's corpse to fashion a lampshade made of his hide, which they display on their bedside table lamp, using Lenny's necklace as a switch.

Following the war, the lamp is returned to Lenny's mother, who keeps it as part of a shrine honoring Lenny. When her hand makes contact with the surface of the shade, the lamp lights up, and by what appears to be an act of God, the swastika transforms into a Star of David. It is proclaimed to be a miracle, and soon, she, holding the lamp, stands before president Harry S. Truman, who awards the Purple Heart to the lampshade.

Cast
Rusty Goffe as Lenny, a young Jewish boy living in Brooklyn, New York City
Phil Pritchard as Adolf Hitler
Rosey Thewlis as Eva Braun, Hitler's mistress
Lisi Tribble as Lenny's mother
Rufus Graham as United States president Harry S. Truman

Production
Following a discussion about film censorship with British broadcaster Melvyn Bragg while they worked on The South Bank Show, Bragg challenged Russell to create a film which Russell himself would want banned. The result was A Kitten for Hitler. After Russell sent Bragg an initial draft, Bragg responded, "Ken, if ever you make this film and it is shown, you will be lynched."

Phil Pritchard portrayed Adolf Hitler. Those auditioning for the part were asked to attend the casting dressed as Hitler, creating a bizarre waiting room scene. Due to the content of the film, Russell couldn't convince any child actor's parents to let their son appear in the film. Russell decided to fill the role of Lenny with an adult with dwarfism. He thus cast Rusty Goffe, who played an Oompa-Loompa in the 1971 film Willy Wonka and the Chocolate Factory. Russell's wife Lisi played Lenny's mother, and his daughter organized the costumes. He shot the entire film in a studio in Shoreditch against a green screen with backgrounds added during post-production. The film premiered on the website Comedybox.tv, after Russell was introduced to Dan Schreiber by screenwriter Emma Millions.

Reception
Ken Russell later described A Kitten for Hitler as his most bizarre and shocking, even more so than his banned 1971 work The Devils, although he also described it as a comedy. Russell told the story of the film to fellow director Quentin Tarantino at a film festival, who reacted favourably. In 2012, it was included in a list of six alternative Christmas films by British newspaper The Guardian.

References

External links

 Flash Video from Iain Fisher, Film Editor

British comedy short films
British black comedy films
British Christmas films
British Christmas comedy films
2007 short films
2007 films
Films set in Brooklyn
Films set in Germany
Films set in 1941
Films about cats
Films about Jews and Judaism
Films about Nazi Germany
Films directed by Ken Russell
Films about Adolf Hitler
Films set in New York (state)
Films set in New York City
Cultural depictions of Eva Braun
Cultural depictions of Harry S. Truman
2000s English-language films
2000s British films